"No Way Out" is the first Christmas special of the BBC sitcom Porridge. It first aired on 24 December 1975. In this episode, prisoner Tommy Slocombe makes an escape attempt in the lead-up to Christmas.

Synopsis
Christmas has come to Slade Prison. Godber, with his innocent nature, likes the idea of Christmas, but Fletcher tells him that Christmas in prison is little different to any other day. Godber points out that there are carol singers, but Fletcher remarks that they are there to drown out the sound of Tommy Slocombe's tunnelling.

Fletcher tries to visit the prison's infirmary with his bad knee, but the prison doctor refuses to admit him. Instead, he gives Fletcher an appointment at a civilian hospital, Carlisle General. With this information, Harry Grout requests that Fletcher picks up an important object from a nurse at the hospital.

Mr Barrowclough is given the job of escorting Fletcher to hospital, although he finds the very edgy Fletcher's grumbling a dampener on his day. At the hospital, a young nurse gives Fletcher a "Christmas card", which turns out to be a fake passport for Tommy Slocombe. Grouty also asks that Fletcher and Godber help with the choir, but also insists that Fletcher provides him with a bicycle.

Unfortunately, Barrowclough's bicycle is stolen as part of the escape plan and, on confronting Godber, Warren and Fletcher about the theft, he is left in a state of confusion with their responses. Mr Mackay berates Barrowclough for being too trusting with the prisoners. To make matters worse, Mackay discovers what is going on with the tunnelling, and orders the men back to their cells. Lukewarm, a skilled pickpocket, manages to steal Barrowclough's wristwatch under the façade of wishing him a Merry Christmas. Mackay's wallet is also stolen.

Due to these events, Christmas is cancelled in Slade Prison. Fletcher realises that things have gone too far and speaks to Harry Grout, who confides that the tunnel is off-course anyway. Fletcher arranges to have a word with Mackay; his plan is for Mackay to fall into the tunnel, and Grout can use the distraction to smuggle Slocombe out another way, but Fletcher miscalculates the tunnel's location and ends up falling into the tunnel himself.

With the escape attempt apparently thwarted, Christmas is reinstated and Fletcher is in the infirmary. As Fletcher is eating Christmas lunch, Mackay tries to bribe him with an almost full small bottle of whisky if he tells him where the earth from the tunnel went. Fletcher tells Mackay that they dug another tunnel and hid the earth there. The episode ends with a triumphant Fletcher drinking his whisky and wishing Mackay a Merry Christmas.

Episode cast

Notes 
 It has been established that Warren cannot read. However, he is seen holding a hymn book while singing in the choir. It could be however, that due to the choir singing the same four carols over and over, that he has memorised the lyrics as he is not seen reading from the book itself.
 Mackay mentions that he went to the Governor's sherry party. However, it is revealed in the following year's Christmas special that the Governor is teetotal. Although it is entirely feasible that the Governor could throw a sherry party without drinking alcohol himself.

References

Porridge (1974 TV series) episodes
British Christmas television episodes
1975 British television episodes